St. Peter's Matric Hr. Sec. School is an independent coeducational residential school in Kodaikanal, Tamil Nadu, India. The school offers an educational programme from Kindergarten to Grade 12 and gathers together students from all parts of India and abroad.

School offers syllabuses: Cambridge IGCSE, the Tamil Nadu state board also known as Matriculation and CBSE(the Indian National curriculum)

The founder of St. Peters International School, Mr J. Sambabu, pioneered Indian-run English medium schools in Kodaikanal in the year 1979.

The school has currently entered into the 33rd year of gratifying service to the people of Kodaikanal.

St. Peter's School Kodaikanal is one of the very few schools in India to have a separate ESL department. The ESL department specially caters to students from non-English speaking countries like Korea, Thailand, and China who are looking to develop their English.

After learning adequate English skills in the ESL classroom, the children are transferred to regular classes and join the mainstream of academic curriculum.

Another unique feature of St. Peter's School Kodaikanal is to recruit teachers from the United States who have exclusive training in ESL teaching methodology. Special training is also given to our Indian teachers to handle ESL classes effectively.

External links
 www.petersschoolkodai.com
 Find an IGCSE school
 What is IGCSE

Boarding schools in Tamil Nadu
Primary schools in Tamil Nadu
High schools and secondary schools in Tamil Nadu
Education in Dindigul district
Kodaikanal